Peggie (or Peggy) Crombie (1901–1984) was an Australian modernist painter. She was a member of the Melbourne Society of Women Painters and Sculptors.

Biography
Crombie was born in 1901 in Melbourne, Australia. In 1921 she studied art at Stott's Commercial Art Training Institute. From 1922 through 1928 she attended the National Gallery Art School in Melbourne, where she was taught by Lindsay Bernard Hall, William Beckwith McInnes and George Bell.

Crombie exhibited her work with modernist groups in Melbourne, specifically The Embryos, the 1932 Group, the New Art Club, the Melbourne Society of Women Painters and Sculptors, and the Victorian Artists Society.

Crombie died in 1984.

External links
images of Peggy Crombie's paintings on MutualArt
Peggy Crombie [Australian art and artists file], State Library Victoria

References

1901 births
1984 deaths
20th-century Australian women artists
20th-century Australian artists
Artists from Melbourne
National Gallery of Victoria Art School alumni